By Special Request is a studio album by Guy Lombardo, released in 1962 in the United States by Decca Records.

Track listing

References

1962 albums
Decca Records albums
Guy Lombardo albums